There are a number of languages of Morocco. De jure, the two official languages are Standard Arabic and Standard Moroccan Berber. Moroccan Arabic (known as Darija) is by far the primary spoken vernacular and lingua franca, whereas Berber languages serve as vernaculars for significant portions of the country. The languages of prestige in Morocco are Arabic in its Classical and Modern Standard Forms and sometimes French, the latter of which serves as a second language for approximately 33% of Moroccans. According to a 2000–2002 survey done by Moha Ennaji, author of Multilingualism, Cultural Identity, and Education in Morocco, "there is a general agreement that Standard Arabic, Moroccan Arabic, and Berber are the national languages." Ennaji also concluded "This survey confirms the idea that multilingualism in Morocco is a vivid sociolinguistic phenomenon, which is favored by many people."

There are around 6 million Berber speakers in Morocco. French retains a major place in Morocco, as it is taught universally and serves as Morocco's primary language of commerce and economics, culture, sciences and medicine; it is also widely used in education and government. Morocco is a member of the Francophonie. 

Spanish is spoken by many Moroccans, particularly in the northern regions around Tetouan and Tangier, as well as in parts of the south, due to historic ties and business interactions with Spain.

According to a 2012 study by the Government of Spain, 98% of Moroccans spoke Moroccan Arabic, 63% spoke French, 26% Berber, 14% spoke English, and 10% spoke Spanish.

History 
Historically, languages such as Phoenician, Punic, and Amazigh languages have been spoken in Morocco. Juba II, king of Mauretania, wrote in Greek and Latin. It is unclear how long African Romance was spoken, but its influence on Northwest African Arabic (particularly in the language of northwestern Morocco) indicates it must have had a significant presence in the early years after the Arab conquest.

Arabic came with the Muslim conquest of the Maghreb; Abdellah Guennoun cites the Friday sermon delivered by Tariq Ibn Ziad just before the conquest of al-Andalus in 711 as the first instance of Moroccan literature in Arabic. However, the language spread much more slowly than the religion. At first, Arabic was used only in urban areas, especially in cities in the north, while the rural areas remained the domain of Amazigh languages.

The khaṭīb, or sermon-giver, of al-Qarawiyyīn Mosque in Fes, Mahdī b. ‘Īsā, was replaced under the Almohads by Abū l-Ḥasan b. ‘Aṭiyya khaṭīb because the latter was fluent in Berber.

The first recorded work in Darija or Moroccan Arabic is Al-Kafif az-Zarhuni's epic zajal poem "al-Mala'ba," dating back to the reign of Marinid Sultan Abu al-Hasan Ali ibn Othman.

Language policy 
After Morocco gained independence with the end of the French Protectorate in 1956, it started a process of Arabization. For this task, the Institute for Studies and Research on Arabization was established by decree in 1960. The policy of Arabization was not applied in earnest until 17 years after independence. An editorial in Lamalif in 1973 argued that, although French unified the elite and major sections of the economy, national unity could only be achieved based on Arabic—though Lamalif called for a new incarnation of the language, describing Standard Arabic as untenably prescriptive and Moroccan vernacular Arabic (Darija) as too poor to become in and of itself a language of culture and knowledge.

In the year 2000, after years of neglecting and ignoring the other languages present in Morocco, the Charter for Educational Reform recognized them and the necessity for them.

Until then the Berber languages were marginalized in the modern society and the number of monolingual speakers decreased. In recent years, the Berber culture has been gaining strength and some developments promise that these languages will not die (Berber is the generic name for the Berber languages. The term Berber is not used nor known by the speakers of these languages).

Arabic, on the other hand, has been perceived as a prestigious language in Morocco for over a millennium. However, there are very distinctive varieties of Arabic used, not all equally prestigious, which are MSA (Modern Standard Arabic), the written form used in schools and ‘Dialectal Arabic’, the non-standardized spoken form. The difference between the two forms in terms of grammar, phonology and vocabulary is so great, it can be considered as diglossia. MSA is practically foreign to Moroccan schoolchildren, and this creates problems with reading and writing,  consequently leading to a high level of illiteracy in Morocco.

The French language is also dominant in Morocco, especially in education and administration, therefore was initially learned by an elite and later on was learned by a great number of Moroccans for use in domains such as finance, science, technology and media. That is despite the government decision to implement a language policy of ignoring French after gaining independence, for the sake of creating a monolingual country.

From its independence until the year 2000, Morocco opted for Arabization as a policy, in an attempt of replacing French with Arabic. By the end of the 1980s, Arabic was the dominant language in education, although French was still in use in many important domains. The goals of Arabization were not met, in linguistic terms, therefore a change was needed.

In 2000 the Charter of Educational Reform introduced a drastic change in language policy. From then on, Morocco has adopted a clear perpetual educational language policy with three main cores: improving and reinforcing the teaching of Arabic, using a variety of languages, such as English and French in teaching the fields of technology and science and acceptance of Berber. The state of Morocco still sees Arabic (MSA) as its national language, but acknowledges that not all Moroccans are Arabic speakers and that Arabization did not succeed in the area of science and technology. The aims of the Charter seem to have been met faster than expected, probably since the conditions of the Charter started to be implemented immediately. Nowadays the different minority languages are acknowledged in Morocco although Arabic still is the dominant one and is being promoted by the government.

Amazigh was made an official language in 2011. In 2019, a law was enacted to implement the constitutional changes from 2011. In particular, Amazigh was extended to all public services. Moroccan citizens can get their marriage certificates, identity cards, passports, and driver's licenses in Amazigh and the language can be used in courts. The government aims to generalize Amazigh education to all Moroccan schools. However, as of 2023, only 10% of Moroccan pupils study Amazigh. The government hired civil servants able to speak the three main dialects (Tachalhit, Tamazight and Tarifet) to help citizens in courts, hospitals, and other public services.

Education 
Framework Law 17:51 allowed scientific subjects to be taught in foreign languages—especially French—in public elementary schools.

In 2019, the Parliament voted to expand Amazigh classes to all Moroccan schools. According to Prime Minister Aziz Akhannouch, about 2,000 schools taught Amazigh in 2022 and the government was training more teachers to accelerate the roll out of Amazigh teaching. As of 2023, this reform is still in progress.

Arabic 
Arabic, along with Berber, is one of Morocco's two official languages, although it is the Moroccan dialect of Arabic, namely Darija, meaning "everyday/colloquial language"; that is spoken or understood, frequently as a second language, by the majority of the population (about 85% of the total population). Many native Berber speakers also speak the local Arabic variant as a second language. Arabic in its Classical and Standard forms is one of the two prestige languages in Morocco. Aleya Rouchdy, author of Language Contact and Language Conflict in Arabic, said that Classical/Modern Arabic and French are constantly in conflict with one another, but that most Moroccans believe that the bilingualism of Classical Arabic and French is the most optimal choice to allow for Morocco's development.

In 1995 the number of native Arabic speakers in Morocco was approximately 18.8 million (65% of the total population), and 21 million including the Moroccan diaspora.

As a member of the Maghrebi Arabic grouping of dialects, Moroccan Arabic is similar to the dialects spoken in Mauritania, Algeria, Tunisia, and Libya (and also Maltese). The so called Darija dialect of Morocco is quite different from its Middle Eastern counterparts but in general understandable to each other, it’s estimated that Darija shares 70/75% of its vocabulary with Modern Standard Arabic. The country shows a marked difference in urban and rural dialects. This is due to the history of settlement. traditionally, Arabs established centers of power in only a few cities and ports in the region, with the effect that the other areas remained Berber-speaking. Then, in the 13th century, Bedouin tribes swept through many of the unsettled areas, spreading with them their distinct Arabic dialect in the non-urbanized areas and leaving speakers of Berber isolated in the mountainous regions.

Modern Standard and Classical Arabic 
Moroccans learn Standard Arabic as a language. It is generally not spoken at home or on the streets. Standard Arabic is frequently used in administrative offices, mosques, and schools. According to Rouchdy, within Morocco Classical Arabic is still only used in literary and cultural aspects, formal traditional speeches, and discussions about religion.

Dialectal Arabic

Moroccan Arabic 

Moroccan Arabic, along with Berber, is one of two languages spoken in homes and on the street. The language is not used in writing. Abdelâli Bentahila, the author of the 1983 book Language Attitudes among Arabic–French Bilinguals in Morocco, said that Moroccans who were bilingual in both French and Arabic preferred to speak Arabic while discussing religion; while discussing matters in a grocery store or restaurant; and while discussing matters with family members, beggars, and maids. Moha Ennaji, author of Multilingualism, Cultural Identity, and Education in Morocco, said that Moroccan Arabic has connotations of informality, and that Moroccan Arabic tends to be used in casual conversations and spoken discourse. Ennaji added that Bilingual Moroccans tend to use Moroccan Arabic while in the house. Berbers generally learn Moroccan Arabic as a second language and use it as a lingua franca, since not all versions of Berber are mutually intelligible with one another.

The below table presents statistical figures of speakers, based on the 2014 population census. This table includes not only native speakers of Arabic, but also people who speak Arabic as a second or third language.

Hassani Arabic
Hassānīya, is spoken by about 0.8% of the population mainly in the Southern regions of Morocco. Communities of speakers exist elsewhere in Morocco too.

The below table presents statistical figures of speakers, based on the 2014 population census.

Berber 

The exact population of speakers of Berber languages is hard to ascertain, since most North African countries do not – traditionally – record language data in their censuses (An exception to this was the 2004 Morocco population census). The Ethnologue provides a useful academic starting point; however, its bibliographic references are inadequate, and it rates its own accuracy at only B-C for the area. Early colonial censuses may provide better documented figures for some countries; however, these are also very much out of date. The number for each Berber language is difficult to estimate.

Berber serves as a vernacular language in many rural areas of Morocco. Berber, along with Moroccan Arabic, is one of two languages spoken in homes and on the street. The population does not use Berber in writing. Aleya Rouchdy, author of "Language Contact and Language Conflict in Arabic," said that Berber is mainly used in the contexts of family, friendship, and "street". In his 2000–2002 research, Ennaji found that 52% of the interviewees placed Berber as a language inferior to Arabic because it did not have a prestigious status and because its domain was restricted. Ennaji added that "[t]he dialectisation of Berber certainly reduces its power of communication and its spread."

Speakers of Riffian language were estimated to be around 1.5 million in 1990.
The language is spoken in the Rif area in the north of the country and is one of the three main Berber languages of Morocco.

The Tashelhit language is considered to be the most widely spoken as it covers the whole of the Region Souss-Massa-Drâa, and is also spoken in the Marrakech-Tensift-El Haouz and Tadla-Azilal regions. Studies done in 1990 show around 3 million people, concentrated in the south of Morocco, speak the language.

Central Morocco Tamazight is the second Berber language in Morocco. A 1998 study done by Ethnologue, shows that around 3 million people speak the language in Morocco. The language is most used in the regions Middle Atlas, High Atlas and east High Atlas Mountains.

Other Berber languages are spoken in Morocco, as the Senhaja de Srair and the Ghomara dialects in the Rif mountains, the Figuig Shilha (not to be confused with Atlas Shilha) and Eastern Zenati in eastern Morocco, and Eastern Middle Atlas dialects in central Morocco.

2014 Population Census 
Local used languages in Morocco:

2014 Population Census by region
The below table presents statistical figures of speakers of Berber languages, based on the 2014 population census.

Other studies
"Few census figures are available; all countries (Algeria and Morocco included) do not count Berber languages. Population shifts in location and number, effects of urbanization and education in other languages, etc., make estimates difficult. In 1952 A. Basset (LLB.4) estimated the number of Berberophones at 5,500,000. Between 1968 and 1978 estimates ranged from eight to thirteen million (as reported by Galand, LELB 56, pp. 107, 123–25); Voegelin and Voegelin (1977, p. 297) call eight million a conservative estimate. In 1980, S. Chaker estimated that the Berberophone populations of Kabylie and the three Moroccan groups numbered more than one million each; and that in Algeria, 3,650,000, or one out of five Algerians, speak a Berber language (Chaker 1984, pp. 8-)

In 1952, André Basset ("La langue berbère", Handbook of African Languages, Part I, Oxford) estimated that a "small majority" of Morocco's population spoke Berber. The 1960 census estimated that 34% of Moroccans spoke Berber, including bi-, tri-, and quadrilinguals. In 2000, Karl Prasse cited "more than half" in an interview conducted by Brahim Karada at Tawalt.com. According to the Ethnologue (by deduction from its Moroccan Arabic figures), the Berber-speaking population is estimated at 65% (1991 and 1995). However, the figures it gives for individual languages only add up to 7.5 million, or about 57%. Most of these are accounted for by three dialects: 
Riff: 4.5 million (1991)
Shilha: 7 million (1998)
Central Morocco Tamazight: 7 million (1998)
This nomenclature is common in linguistic publications, but is significantly complicated by local usage: thus Shilha is sub-divided into Shilha of the Dra valley, Tasusit (the language of the Souss) and several other (mountain) dialects. Moreover, linguistic boundaries are blurred, such that certain dialects cannot accurately be described as either Central Morocco Tamazight (spoken in the Central and eastern Atlas area) or Shilha. The differences among all Moroccan dialects are not too pronounced: public radio news are broadcast using the various dialects; each journalist speaks his or her own dialect with the result that understanding is not obstructed, though most southern Berbers find that understanding Riff requires some getting used to.

French

Within Morocco, French, one of the country's two prestige languages, is often used for business, diplomacy, and government; and serves as a lingua franca. Aleya Rouchdy, author of Language Contact and Language Conflict in Arabic, said that "For all practical purposes, French is used as a second language."

Different figures of French speakers in Morocco are given. According to the OIF, 33% of Moroccans speak French, among them 13.5% fully francophone and thus bilingual with one of the other Moroccan languages, and 19.5% partially francophone. According to the 2004 census, nearly 69% of literate people can read and write French.

It is also the mother language of some Moroccans, regrouped mainly in the western side of the country (Casablanca and Rabat mainly, but also many other cities).

Spanish
In a survey from 2005 by the CIDOB (Barcelona Centre for International Affairs), 21.9% of respondents from Morocco claimed to speak Spanish, with higher percentages in the northern regions. The use of Spanish in northern Morocco and Western Sahara derives largely from the fact that Spain had previously occupied those areas and incorporated Spanish Sahara as a province. In these regions Spanish television is often watched and there are interactions in Spanish on a daily basis. 

After Morocco declared independence in 1956, French and Arabic became the main languages of administration and education, causing the role of Spanish to decline.

Today, Spanish is still offered as one of the foreign languages in the educational system but has fallen well behind French and English. According to the Cervantes Institute, there were 11,409 students learning Spanish in Morocco in 2017, a large decline from about 50,000 in 2005. Demand for Spanish and overall competency in the language has fallen overall since the start of the 21st century.

See also

Arabic
Berber languages
Languages of Algeria
Languages of Mauritania
Languages of Spain
Languages of Tunisia

References 
 Ennaji, Moha. Multilingualism, Cultural Identity, and Education in Morocco. Springer Publishing, January 20, 2005. p. 127. , 9780387239798.
 Rouchdy, Aleya. Language Contact and Language Conflict in Arabic. Psychology Press, January 6, 2003. Volume 3 of Curzon Arabic Linguistics Series, Curzon Studies in Arabic Linguistics. p. 71. , 9780700713790.
Stevens, Paul B. "Language Attitudes among Arabic-French Bilinguals in Morocco." (book review) Journal of Language and Social Psychology. 1985 4:73. p. 73–76. .

Notes

Further reading

 Bentahila, Abdelâli. "Language attitudes among Arabic-French bilinguals in Morocco". Multilingual Matters (Clevedon, Avon, England), 1983. Series #4.  (electronic book), 0585259763 (electronic book), 9780585259765 (electronic book).
 Bentahila, Abdelâli. "Motivations for Code-Switching among Arabic-French Bilinguals in Morocco." Language & Communication. 1983. Volume 3, p. 233 – 243. , E, .
 Chakrani, Brahim. "A sociolinguistic investigation of language attitudes among youth in Morocco." (dissertation) ProQuest. . UMI Number: 3452059.
 Heath, Jeffrey. "Jewish and Muslim Dialects of Moroccan Arabic". Routledge, 2013.  (preview)
 Keil-Sagawe, Regina. "Soziokulturelle und sprachenpolitische Aspekte der Francophonie am Beispiel Marokko (Manuskripte zur Sprachlehrforschung, 38) by Martina Butzke-Rudzynski" (review). Zeitschrift für französische Sprache und Literatur. Franz Steiner Verlag. Bd. 106, H. 3, 1996. p. 295–298. Available at JStor. The document is in the German language.
 Lahjomri, Abdeljalil. Enseignement de la langue francaise au Maroc et dialogue des cultures (Teaching of the French Language in Morocco and Dialogue of Cultures). Francais dans le Monde. 1984. p. 18–21. ERIC #: EJ312036. The document is in the French language. See profile at ERIC.
 Languages of Morocco
 Sadiqi, Fatima. Women, Gender and Language in Morocco. 01/2003, Women and Gender Ser., Volume 1., p. 354 
 Salah-Dine Hammoud, Mohamed (1982). "Arabization in Morocco: A Case Study in Language Planning and Language Policy Attitudes." Unpublished PhD dissertation for the University of Texas at Austin, Available from University Microfilms International, Ann Arbor, Michigan.